Roger Hertog (born July 5,1941) is an American businessman, financier, and conservative philanthropist. Born and raised in The Bronx borough of New York City, New York, Hertog pursued a career in business, becoming president of Sanford Bernstein (now AllianceBernstein). He currently serves as president of the Hertog Foundation and chairman of the Tikvah Fund, which promotes Jewish thought and ideas.

Personal life and career
Born to German Jewish immigrants, Hertog was raised in The Bronx and attended public schools. His first job was in the mail room of a financial company while attending City College at night. Eventually, he joined Oppenheimer & Co. in a clerical position. At Oppenheimer, he met his future business partner, Sanford Bernstein. In 1967, Hertog joined Sanford C. Bernstein, & Co. The struggling company went on to become one of the world's leading asset management firms. Hertog remained president of the firm until its merger with Alliance Capital Management in 2000. He retired in 2006 from AllianceBernstein L.P. and remains Vice-Chairman Emeritus.

His wife, Susan Hertog, graduated from Hunter College and earned her M.F.A. from Columbia University School of the Arts in 1993. Roger and Susan Hertog have three grown children.

Philanthropy 

Hertog is co-president of the Hertog Foundation and chairman of the Tikvah Fund. He currently serves as the executive committee chairman for the New York Historical Society’s board of directors, and as a board member at the Alexander Hamilton Society. Hertog has spent time on the boards of the American Enterprise Institute, Thomas Jefferson Foundation, the Washington Institute for Near-East Policy, and is a chairman emeritus of the Manhattan Institute for Policy Research. He was a part-owner of now-defunct The New York Sun and The New Republic, and is a board member at Commentary. He is also a major supporter of National Affairs magazine, edited by Yuval Levin.

His family foundation supports several educational fellowships for college students and young professionals. In 2010, the foundation launched the Political Studies Program, an elite, full-scholarship summer program for undergraduates in the theory and practice of politics. In 2013, in partnership with the Institute for the Study of War, Hertog expanded by launching a two-week summer seminar on warfare and military doctrine for advanced undergraduates, the War Studies Program. The Foundation offers other programs and seminars in three main areas: Political Thought and Philosophy; War and Foreign Affairs; and Economics and Domestic Policy.

Hertog often donates to Jewish organizations and causes. His main avenue is through the Tikvah Fund. Hertog has served as the chair of Tikvah since 1999. Tikvah runs and invests in a wide range of initiatives, including educational programs, publications, and fellowships, around the world. As part of his work with Tikvah, Hertog helped fund the Shalem Center in Israel. The Center has since become Shalem College, accredited in 2013 to confer bachelor's degrees. Hertog has also given money to the Anti-Defamation League, Taglit-Birthright Israel, and American Friends of Shalva.

Apart from his educational work, Hertog has been a strong supporter of arts and culture in New York City. He is credited with helping spur modernization at the New-York Historical Society, joining the board in 2003. In 2004, Hertog and fellow board members Lewis E. Lehrman and Richard Gilder helped fund an Alexander Hamilton exhibit at N-YHS. Additionally, he sponsored the creation of the Bronx Library Center, which opened in 2006.

During the 1990s, Hertog, along with other investors, launched one of the first privately funded school-voucher programs, funding 1,000 scholarships annually for poor families interested in sending their children to private schools. Over 25,000 applied for the scholarships. He has invested in the Success Charter Network and Families for Excellent Schools in New York. Recently, he funded a study on the charter school movement in New York City and ways to better invest in it.

On November 15, 2007, Hertog was awarded a National Humanities Medal in a White House ceremony with U.S. President George W. Bush. The citation accompanying the award praised Hertog for "enlightened philanthropy on behalf of the humanities. His wisdom and generosity have rejuvenated institutions that are keepers of American memory." He won the William E. Simon Prize for Philanthropic Leadership in 2010.

See also

 List of philanthropists
 List of people from The Bronx

References

External links
 The Hertog Foundation 
 The Tikvah Fund

1941 births
Living people
American Enterprise Institute
American financial businesspeople
American people of German-Jewish descent
Jewish American philanthropists
Philanthropists from New York (state)
Businesspeople from New York City
National Humanities Medal recipients
The New Republic people
People from the Bronx
Date of birth missing (living people)
21st-century American Jews